Tsering Wangmo Dhompa (born 1969) is the first Tibetan female poet to be published in English. She was raised in India and Nepal. Tsering received her BA from Lady Shri Ram College, University of Delhi. She pursued her MA from University of Massachusetts and her MFA in creative writing from San Francisco State University.  She has a Ph.D. in literature from the University of California, Santa Cruz and is currently an assistant professor in the English Department at Villanova University.  Her first book of poems, Rules of the House, published by Apogee Press in 2002, was a finalist for the Asian American Literary Awards in 2003. Other publications include, most recently a chapbook Revolute  (Albion Books, 2021),My Rice Tastes Like the Lake  (Apogee Press 2011), In the Absent Everyday (also from Apogee Press), and two chapbooks: In Writing the Names (A.bacus, Poets & Poets Press) and Recurring Gestures (Tangram Press). In Letter For Love she delivered her first short story. In 2013, Penguin India published Tsering's first full-length book, A Home in Tibet, in which she chronicles her successive journeys to Tibet and provides ethnographic details of ordinary Tibetans inside Tibet.

Bibliography

Books
Revolute, Albion Books, VA 2021
Coming Home to Tibet, Shambhala Publications, Boulder 2016
A Home in Tibet, Penguin India, Delhi 2013
My Rice Tastes Like the Lake, Apogee Press, Berkeley 2011
In the Absent Everyday, Apogee Press, Berkeley 2005
Rules of the House, Apogee Press, Berkeley 2002
Recurring Gestures, Tangram Press,
In Writing the Names, Abacus, 2000

Anthologies
Old Demons, New Deities: Twenty-One Short Stories from Tibet, edited by Tenzin Dickie. OR Books, 2021.
Contemporary Voices of the Eastern World: An Anthology of Poems, edited by Tina Chang, Nathalie Handal, and Ravi Shankar.  W.W. Norton and Co. 2007
The Wisdom Anthology of North American Buddhist Poetry Ed. Andrew Schelling, Wisdom Publications 2005 Page 41-51
Muses in Exile: An Anthology of Tibetan Poetry Ed. Bhuchung D. Sonam  Paljor Publications Pvt. Ltd. India 2005.
An Other Voice: English Literature from Nepal, edited by Deepak Thapa and Kesang Tseten, Martin Chautari 2002 Nepal

Articles
"This Wor(l)d as an Illusion", Evening will Come, March 2011
 Letter For Love, Caravan Magazine, Vol. 2, Issue 08 (August 2010)
 "After the Earthquake", Phayul April 29, 2010
 Nostalgia in Contemporary Tibetan Writing

See also
List of Tibetan writers

References

Rules of the House
Tsering Wangmo Dhompa - Tibetan English Poetry, Rupkatha.com

External links

Tsering Wangmo Dhompa at Poets.org
Tsering Wangmo Dhompa at the Poetry Foundation
Of Exile and Writing: An Interview with the Tibetan Poet Tsering Wangmo Dhompa

Tibetan poets
Living people
1969 births
University of Massachusetts Amherst alumni
San Francisco State University alumni
Indian emigrants to the United States
American poets of Asian descent
American people of Tibetan descent
American women poets
Tibetan women poets
American women writers of Indian descent
21st-century American poets
21st-century American women writers